The women's pentathlon event  at the 2000 European Athletics Indoor Championships was held on February 25.

Results

References
Results

Combined events at the European Athletics Indoor Championships
Pentathlon
2000 in women's athletics